Rhionaeschna is the scientific name of a genus of dragonflies from the family Aeshnidae. They are also known as blue-eyed darners.

Species
The genus includes the following species:

References

 Rhionaeschna, ITIS Report
 Rhionaeschna, BugGuide

Aeshnidae
Anisoptera genera